This is a list of diplomatic missions of Iran. Iran has a substantial diplomatic network, reflecting its foreign affairs priorities within the Islamic and Non-Aligned world.

In Washington, D.C. the Embassy of Pakistan looks after the interests of Iran in the United States.

Africa

 Algiers (Embassy)

 Kinshasa (Embassy)

 Addis Ababa (Embassy)

 Accra (Embassy)

 Conakry (Embassy)

 Abidjan (Embassy)

 Nairobi (Embassy)

 Tripoli (Embassy)

 Antananarivo (Embassy)

 Bamako (Embassy)

 Nouakchott (Embassy)

 Windhoek (Embassy)

 Niamey (Embassy)

 Abuja (Embassy)

 Dakar (Embassy)

 Freetown (Embassy)

 Pretoria (Embassy)

 Dar es Salaam (Embassy)

 Tunis (Embassy)

 Kampala (Embassy)

 Harare (Embassy)

Americas

 Buenos Aires (Embassy)

 La Paz (Embassy)

 Brasilia (Embassy)

Ottawa (Interests Section via the Embassy of Oman)

 Santiago (Embassy)

 Bogotá (Embassy)

 Havana (Embassy)

 Quito (Embassy)

 Mexico City (Embassy)

 Managua (Embassy)

 Washington, D.C. (Interests Section via the Embassy of Pakistan)

 Montevideo (Embassy)

 Caracas (Embassy)

Asia

 Kabul (Embassy)
 Herat (Consulate-General)
 Jalalabad (Consulate-General)
 Kandahar (Consulate-General)
 Mazar-i Sharif (Consulate-General)

 Yerevan (Embassy)
 Kapan (Consulate-General)

 Baku (Embassy)
 Nakhchivan (Consulate-General)

 Dhaka (Embassy)

 Bandar Seri Begawan (Embassy)

 Phnom Penh (Embassy)

 Beijing (Embassy)
 Guangzhou (Consulate-General)
 Hong Kong (Consulate-General)
 Shanghai (Consulate-General)

 Tbilisi (Embassy)
 Batumi (Consulate-General)

 New Delhi (Embassy)
 Hyderabad (Consulate-General)
 Mumbai (Consulate-General)

 Jakarta (Embassy)

 Baghdad (Embassy)
 Basra (Consulate-General)
 Erbil (Consulate-General)
 Karbala (Consulate-General)
 Najaf (Consulate-General)
 Sulaymaniyah (Consulate-General)

 Tokyo (Embassy)

 Amman (Embassy)

 Astana (Embassy)
 Aktau (Consulate-General)
 Almaty (Consulate-General)

 Kuwait City (Embassy)

 Bishkek (Embassy)

 Beirut (Embassy)

 Kuala Lumpur (Embassy)

 Kathmandu (Consulate)

Pyongyang (Embassy)

 Muscat (Embassy)

 Islamabad (Embassy)
 Karachi (Consulate-General)
 Lahore (Consulate-General)
 Peshawar (Consulate-General)
 Quetta (Consulate-General)

 Manila (Embassy)

 Doha (Embassy)

 Seoul (Embassy)

 Colombo (Embassy)

 Damascus (Embassy)
 Aleppo (Consulate-General)

 Dushanbe (Embassy)

 Bangkok (Embassy)

 Ankara (Embassy)
 Erzurum (Consulate-General)
 Istanbul (Consulate-General)
 Trabzon (Consulate-General)

 Ashgabat (Embassy)
 Mary (Consulate-General)

 Abu Dhabi (Embassy)
 Dubai (Consulate-General)

 Tashkent (Embassy)

 Hanoi (Embassy)

 Sanaa (Embassy)

Europe

 Vienna (Embassy)

 Minsk (Embassy)

 Brussels (Embassy)

 Sarajevo (Embassy)

 Sofia (Embassy)

 Zagreb (Embassy)

 Nicosia (Embassy)

 Prague (Embassy)

 Copenhagen (Embassy)

 Helsinki (Embassy)

 Paris (Embassy)

 Berlin (Embassy)
 Frankfurt (Consulate-General)
 Hamburg (Consulate-General)
 Munich (Consulate-General)

 Athens (Embassy)

 Rome (Embassy)

 Budapest (Embassy)

 Dublin (Embassy)

 Rome (Embassy)
 Milan (Consulate-General)

 The Hague (Embassy)

 Skopje (Embassy)

 Oslo (Embassy)

 Warsaw (Embassy)

 Lisbon (Embassy)

 Bucharest (Embassy)

 Moscow (Embassy)
 Astrakhan (Consulate-General)
 Kazan (Consulate-General)

 Belgrade (Embassy)

 Ljubljana (Embassy)

 Madrid (Embassy)

 Stockholm (Embassy)

 Bern (Embassy)
 Geneva (Consulate-General)

 Kyiv (Embassy)

 London (Embassy)

Oceania

 Canberra (Embassy)

 Wellington (Embassy)

Multilateral organizations
 
Brussels (Permanent Mission)
 
Geneva (Permanent Mission to the United Nations Office)
 New York City (Permanent Mission to the United Nations Office)
 Vienna (Permanent Mission to the United Nations Office)
 
Jeddah (Representation to the Organisation of Islamic Cooperation)

Gallery

Non-resident embassies

Embassies to Open

Former Embassies

 (closed in 1979)

Notes

References

External links
Ministry of Foreign Affairs of the Islamic Republic of Iran
Embassy of Islamic Republic of Iran in Pakistan, Islamabad

 
Diplomatic missions
Iran